Black Whip is the eighth album by guitarist Boogaloo Joe Jones which was recorded in 1973 and released on the Prestige label.

Reception

Allmusic awarded the album 3 stars.

Track listing 
All compositions by Ivan "Boogaloo Joe" Jones except where noted.
 "Black Whip" – 6:45 
 "My Love" (Linda McCartney, Paul McCartney) – 5:26
 "Freak Off" – 8:29
 "Daniel" (Elton John, Bernie Taupin) – 4:20
 "Ballad of Mad Dogs and Englishmen" (Leon Russell) – 6:56  
 "Crank Me Up" – 7:06

Personnel 
Ivan "Boogaloo Joe" Jones – guitar
Dave Hubbard – soprano saxophone, tenor saxophone, percussion
Bobby Knowles- organ
Sonny Phillips – electric piano
Ron Carter – bass, electric bass
Bud Kelly – drums, percussion
Jimmy Johnson – percussion

References 

Boogaloo Joe Jones albums
1973 albums
Prestige Records albums
Albums produced by Ozzie Cadena